This is a list of cities and towns in the Western Cape province of South Africa. They are divided according to the districts in which they are located.

Cape Metropole

 Atlantis
 Bellville
 Blue Downs
 Brackenfell
 Cape Town
 Crossroads
 Durbanville
 Eerste River
 Elsie's River
 Fish Hoek
 Goodwood
 Gordon's Bay
 Guguletu
 Hout Bay
 Khayelitsha
 Kraaifontein
 Kuils River
 Langa
 Macassar
 Melkbosstrand
 Mfuleni
 Milnerton
 Mitchell's Plain
 Noordhoek
 Nyanga
 Observatory
 Parow
 Simon's Town
 Somerset West
 Strand

West Coast

 Aurora
 Bitterfontein
 Chatsworth
 Citrusdal
 Clanwilliam
 Darling
 Doringbaai
 Dwarskersbos
 Ebenhaeser
 Eendekuil
 Elands Bay
 Goedverwacht
 Graafwater
 Grotto Bay
 Hopefield
 Jacobsbaai
 Jakkalsfontein
 Kalbaskraal
 Klawer
 Koekenaap
 Koringberg
 Lamberts Bay
 Langebaan
 Langebaanweg
 Lutzville
 Malmesbury
 Moorreesburg
 Paternoster
 Piketberg
 Porterville
 Redelinghuys
 Riebeek-Kasteel
 Riebeek West
 Saldanha
 St Helena Bay
 Strandfontein
 Vanrhynsdorp
 Velddrif
 Vredenburg
 Vredendal
 Wupperthal
 Yzerfontein

Cape Winelands

 Ashton
 Bonnievale
 Ceres
 De Doorns
 Denneburg
 Franschhoek
 Gouda
 Kayamandi
 Klapmuts
 Kylemore
 Languedoc
 McGregor
 Montagu
 Op-die-Berg
 Paarl
 Pniel
 Prince Alfred Hamlet
 Rawsonville
 Robertson
 Robertsvlei
 Rozendal
 Saron
 Stellenbosch
 Touws River
 Tulbagh
 Wellington
 Wemmershoek
 Wolseley
 Worcester

Overberg

 Arniston
 Baardskeerdersbos
 Betty's Bay
 Birkenhead
 Botrivier
 Bredasdorp
 Caledon
 Dennehof
 De Kelders
 Elgin
 Elim
 Fisherhaven
 Franskraalstrand
 Gansbaai
 Genadendal
 Grabouw
 Greyton
 Hawston
 Hermanus
 Hotagterklip
 Infanta
 Kleinbaai
 Kleinmond
 L'Agulhas
 Napier
 Onrusrivier
 Pearly Beach
 Pringle Bay
 Riviersonderend
 Rooi Els
 Stanford
 Struisbaai
 Suiderstrand
 Suurbraak
 Swellendam
 Van Dyksbaai
 Vermont
 Villiersdorp

Garden Route

 Albertinia 
 Boggomsbaai 
 Brenton-on-Sea 
 Buffelsbaai 
 Dana Baai 
 De Rust 
 Dysselsdorp 
 Friemersheim 
 George 
 Glentana 
 Gouritsmond 
 Great Brak River 
 Groot-Jongensfontein 
 Haarlem 
 Hartenbos 
 Heidelberg 
 Herbertsdale 
 Herolds Bay 
 Keurboomsrivier 
 Keurboomstrand 
 Knysna 
 Kranshoek 
 Kurland Estate 
 Little Brak River 
 Mossel Bay 
 Nature's Valley 
 Noetzie 
 Pacaltsdorp 
 Plettenberg Bay 
 Port Beaufort 
 Rheenendal 
 Riversdale 
 Sedgefield 
 Slangrivier 
 Stilbaai 
 Uniondale 
 Volmoed 
 Victoria Bay 
 Wilderness 
 Wittedrift 
 Zoar

Klein Karoo

 Montagu 
 Barrydale 
 Ladismith 
 Calitzdorp
 Oudtshoorn 
 De Rust

Central Karoo

 Beaufort West
 Laingsburg
 Leeu-Gamka
 Matjiesfontein
 Merweville
 Murraysburg
 Nelspoort
 Prince Albert

 
Western Cape
Cities and towns